Hard Facts  is a 1944 novel by the British writer Howard Spring. A young curate is sent to work in Manchester, where he encounters the Dunkersly family who own a struggling printing firm. It was followed by a sequel Dunkerley's in 1946.

References

Bibliography
 Merriam-Webster's Encyclopedia of Literature. Merriam-Webster, 1995.

1944 British novels
Novels by Howard Spring
Novels set in Manchester
William Collins, Sons books